Torrens Island is an island in South Australia.

Torrens Island may also refer to the following places in South Australia.

Torrens Island Power Station, a power station 
Torrens Island Concentration Camp, former internment facility
Torrens Island Conservation Park, a protected area
Torrens Island Quarantine Station, a former quarantine facility
Torrens Island, South Australia, a suburb

See also
Torrens (disambiguation)